"Ball of Confusion (That's What the World Is Today)" is a 1970 hit single for The Temptations. It was released on the Gordy (Motown) label, and written by Norman Whitfield and Barrett Strong.

The song was used to anchor The Temptations' 1970 Greatest Hits II LP. It reached #3 on the US pop charts and #2 on the US R&B charts. Billboard ranked the record as the #24 song of 1970. It reached #7 in the UK Singles Chart.

Although a nearly eleven minute long backing track was recorded by The Funk Brothers, only slightly more than four minutes was used for the Temptations' version of the song. The full backing track can be heard on the 1971 self titled debut album of the Motown group The Undisputed Truth.

Cash Box said of the song that the Temptations came up with "another shocker featuring studio-work voltage and the charge of new-Temps lyric power" and "another electrifying experience."

Personnel
 Lead vocals by Dennis Edwards, Eddie Kendricks, Paul Williams, and Melvin Franklin
 Background vocals by Dennis Edwards, Eddie Kendricks, Paul Williams, Melvin Franklin, and Otis Williams
 Written by Norman Whitfield and Barrett Strong
 Produced by Norman Whitfield
 Instrumentation by The Funk Brothers

In popular culture
Randy Shilts quoted the lyrics from "Ball of Confusion" when he named his award-winning journalistic account of the AIDS epidemic, And the Band Played On. In the song, the repeated usage of the phrase "and the band played on" signaled that no one was paying proper attention to world problems, in the same manner the AIDS epidemic was initially ignored.

The Undisputed Truth’s 1971 cover of the song was featured in the trailers for the 2022 film Nope.

The thrash metal band Anthrax covered this song in 1999. Other covers of this song include versions by Red Rockers and by Love and Rockets. It was also sampled by multiple artists.

Tina Turner version
The song "Ball of Confusion" plays an important part in the career of Tina Turner - if only indirectly. Her recording of the track was included on the 1982 album Music of Quality and Distinction Volume One, a tribute by the British Electric Foundation featuring members of the new wave band Heaven 17, Love and Rockets and a number of guest vocalists covering 1960s and 1970s hits, among them Sandie Shaw, Paul Jones, Billy Mackenzie, Paula Yates and Gary Glitter.

Turner's synth-driven interpretation of "Ball of Confusion" opened the album, was also issued as a single, and became a top five hit in Norway; this led to Capitol Records signing Turner and to Martyn Ware and Ian Craig Marsh recording another 1970s cover with her in late 1983. The track was Al Green's "Let's Stay Together", which became a surprise hit single on both sides of the Atlantic and the starting point of Turner's comeback, with the following 1984 album Private Dancer going multi-platinum in 1984.

Track listing and formats
European 7" single
"Ball of Confusion (That's What the World Is Today)" – 3:50
"Ball of Confusion (That's What the World Is Today)" (Instrumental) – 3:50

Charts

See also
 List of anti-war songs

References

External links 
 List of cover versions of "Ball of Confusion (That's What the World Is Today)" at SecondHandSongs.com

1970 singles
1982 singles
Protest songs
Songs written by Barrett Strong
Songs written by Norman Whitfield
The Temptations songs
Gordy Records singles
Cashbox number-one singles
Psychedelic soul songs
Song recordings produced by Norman Whitfield
1970 songs
Tina Turner songs
Virgin Records singles
Monster Magnet songs